The Trummenäs Ladies Open was a women's professional golf tournament on the Swedish Golf Tour, played between 1999 and 2003. It was always held at Trummenäs Golf Club near Karlskrona, Sweden.

The event was introduced in 1999 as one of the season's four new tournaments, alongside the Telia Grand Opening, Gefle Ladies Open and Albatross Ladies Open.

Winners

References

Swedish Golf Tour (women) events